Instruments used specially in dermatology are as follows:
 Cautery or Diathermy: used to remove unwanted hair, moles, warts, et cetera
 Lasers: for surgeries
 Cryoprobes: used to remove unwanted hair, moles, warts, et cetera

References

Medical equipment
Dermatologic procedures